Bracke may refer to:

 Bräcke Municipality, a Swedish municipality
 Bräcke, a locality in Sweden
 Bracke (grape), another name for the French wine grape Braquet
 Bracke is a German word for hound, which is used to describe multiple dog breeds:
 Deutsche Bracke, literally meaning German Hound
 Finnish Bracke, known as Finnish Hound
 Tiroler Bracke, known as Tyrolean Hound

People with the surname
 Ferdinand Bracke (born 1939), Belgian cyclist
 Roger Bracke (1913–1993), Belgian sculptor
 Siegfried Bracke (born 1953), Belgian politician
 Simon Bracke (born 1995), Belgian footballer
 Tony Bracke (born 1971), Belgian cyclist
  (1842–1880), German social-democrat and journalist